"Bag Skyerne" is a song by Danish singer and songwriter Anne Gadegaard. It was released as a digital download in Denmark on 6 May 2013 through Awake Music. The song peaked to number 10 on the Danish Singles Chart

Music video
A music video to accompany the release of "Bag Skyerne" was first released onto YouTube on 9 May 2013 at a total length of three minutes and forty-nine seconds.

Track listing

Chart performance

Weekly charts

Release history

References

2013 songs
Anne Gadegaard songs